Ryckman is a surname from Old German with a meaning related to "power";  English versions of the surname include Rickman and Rick.  "Ryckman" is also a Dutch surname arising as a nickname for a rijc man (rich man).

Among the notable people who share this surname are (organized by birth century):
17th Century
Albert Janse Ryckman (1642–1737), American businessman and politician
19th Century
Edmond Baird Ryckman (1866–1934), Canadian politician
Samuel Shobal Ryckman (1849–1929), Canadian businessman and politician
20th Century
Billy Ryckman (born 1955), former professional American football player
Larry Ryckman (born 1959), Canadian-American entertainment, technology and sports entrepreneur
Richard M. Ryckman (born 1937), American psychologist and textbook author
Ron Ryckman Sr. (born 1948), American politician
Ron Ryckman Jr., (born 1971), American politician

See also
Ryckmans
Ryckman Park, public park located on Ocean Avenue in Melbourne Beach, Florida on the Indian River
Ryckman Corners, Ryckman's Corners, a rural hamlet, is located south of Hamilton at Rymal Road and Upper James. Ryckman's Corners was first settled in the late 1790s, It is named after the Ryckman family, one of the earliest settlers on the mountain. Ryckman Corners is located near Hamilton, Ontario, Canada.
<https://www.thespec.com/news-story/2243505-time-capsule-vintage-photos-from-ryckman-s-corners/>

References

Surnames
German-language surnames
Surnames of German origin